Ya – tvoya lybov'!  - is a 2008 studio album of Sofia Rotaru, recorded at Artur-Music in Ukraine. The album was released on 9 June 2008 in Ukraine with 11 tracks. The album includes eight earlier unreleased, but aired in charts songs, one remastered song and two new songs, never aired before the release of the album: Mozart, Look Behind and Don't Walk Away.

Track listing

Gift Album
On the 7th of August, birthday of Sofia Rotaru, was also released a parallel, not for sale, gift album with extended track listing, inncuding two earlier unreleased new songs Lilac Flowers and Look Behind.

Languages of performance 
Songs are performed in Russian language.

References

External links 
 Official CD Discography of Sofia Rotaru
 "Fortuna" Fan Club
 Rotaru has released a new album

2008 albums
Sofia Rotaru albums